Alive in the Nineties is the first video released by the American rock group the Meat Puppets. The video was released in 2003 while the band was on hiatus. The video is professionally shot and was recorded while the band was touring with the Stone Temple Pilots.

DVD features
Available Audio Tracks: English (Dolby Digital 5.1), English (Dolby Digital 2.0 Stereo)
Exclusive Curt Kirkwood Videowave interview
Derrick Bostrom's anecdotes
The Big Bottom Summit with Mike Watt, Flea, and Cris Kirkwood
Testimonials from Watt and Sonic Youth's Thurston Moore
A Puppets slideshow
As seen on TV music video
"Good Golly Miss Molly" from Aksarben, Omaha, Nebraska

Track listing
 "Attacked by Monsters" 
 "Backwater" 
 "Never to Be Found" 
 "Station" 
 "Coming Down" 
 "Violet Eyes" 
 "Wonderful Song" 
 "Plateau" 
 "Sam" 
 "Automatic Mojo" 
 "Lake of Fire" 
 "Six Gallon Pie" 
 "Popskull"

Meat Puppets albums
2003 video albums
2003 live albums
Live video albums